Sergio Murray (born 20 April 1971) is a judoka from the Netherlands Antilles. He competed in the men's middleweight event at the 1996 Summer Olympics.

References

1971 births
Living people
Dutch Antillean male judoka
Olympic judoka of the Netherlands Antilles
Judoka at the 1996 Summer Olympics
Place of birth missing (living people)